In enzymology, a tagatose-6-phosphate kinase is an enzyme that catalyzes the chemical reaction

ATP + D-tagatose 6-phosphate  ADP + D-tagatose 1,6-bisphosphate

Thus, the two substrates of this enzyme are ATP and D-tagatose 6-phosphate, whereas its two products are ADP and D-tagatose 1,6-bisphosphate.

This enzyme belongs to the phosphofructokinase B (PfkB) or Ribokinase family of sugar kinases, specifically those transferring phosphorus-containing groups (phosphotransferases) with an alcohol group as acceptor. The systematic name of this enzyme class is ATP:D-tagatose-6-phosphate 1-phosphotransferase. The members of the PfkB/RK family are identified by the presence of three conserved sequence motifs and their enzymatic activity generally shows a dependence on the presence of pentavalent ions. Pentavalent ions dependency is a conserved property of adenosine kinase from diverse sources: identification of a novel motif implicated in phosphate and magnesium ion binding and substrate inhibition. Biochemistry 2002, 41: 4059-4069.</ref> This enzyme participates in galactose metabolism.

Structural studies

References

 

EC 2.7.1
Enzymes of known structure